Nagar Palika Parishad Bah is an institution of local governance comprising three blocks: Bah, Jaitpur and Pinahat. A Nagar Palika or municipality is an urban local body that administers a city. Nagar Palika is a municipality of Bah, Agra, Uttar Pradesh, India. Nagar Palika is constituted as per the provisions in the Constitution of India (74th Amendment) Act, 1992.

Functions
The Nagar Palika is responsible for

 Water supply
 Hospitals
 Roads
 Street lighting
 Drainage
 Fire brigade
 Market places 
 Records of births and deaths
 Solid waste management

Sources of income
Its sources of income are taxes on water, houses, markets, entertainment and vehicles paid by residents of the town and grants from the state government.

External links

Agra district
Municipalities of India
Local government in Uttar Pradesh